Dasysyrphus friuliensis is a European species of hoverfly.

References

Diptera of Europe
Syrphini
Insects described in 1960